Great Directors is a 2009 documentary film which was written and directed by Angela Ismailos. In the film, Ismailos interviews directors of the late 20th and early 21st centuries, including Bernardo Bertolucci, Catherine Breillat, Liliana Cavani, Stephen Frears, Todd Haynes, Richard Linklater, Ken Loach, David Lynch, John Sayles, and Agnès Varda.

Synopsis

Filmmaker Angela Ismailos has conversations with 10 of the world's most known directors, soliciting their point of view about the creative process and the context of their work in the contemporary world. Among those interviewed are Bernardo Bertolucci, David Lynch, Stephen Frears, Agnès Varda, Ken Loach, Liliana Cavani, Todd Haynes, Catherine Breillat, Richard Linklater and John Sayles, who traced the origins of their art to the influence of their predecessors—Lynch credits Fellini, and, for Haynes' outsider cinema, the work of Rainer Werner Fassbinder plays a role.

Great Directors was debuted at the 2009 Cannes Film Festival in May, and was released in New York City on July 2, 2010.

Critical reception
Review aggregate Rotten Tomatoes reports that 22 critics have given the film a positive review based on 35 reviews, with an average rating of 5.8/10. On Metacritic, the film has a rating score of 49 based on 10 critic reviews.

References

External links

Catherine Breillat on a Yacht at Cannes: "Great Directors" Party (The Huffington Post)
Paladin Has “Great Directors” (indieWIRE)

2009 films
2009 documentary films
American documentary films
2000s English-language films
2000s American films